I Am Not Okay with This is an American coming-of-age black comedy streaming television series based on the graphic novel of the same name by Charles Forsman. The series stars Sophia Lillis, Wyatt Oleff, Sofia Bryant, and Kathleen Rose Perkins. The series was released on Netflix on February 26, 2020, and received positive reviews, with praise for the performances, particularly for Lillis and Oleff.

Originally renewed for a second season, Netflix canceled the series in August 2020, citing "circumstances related to the COVID-19 pandemic".

Cast and characters

Main

 Sophia Lillis as Sydney Novak, a 17-year-old bisexual girl who begins to realize that she has telekinetic powers
 Wyatt Oleff as Stanley "Stan" Barber, Sydney's neighbor and friend
 Sofia Bryant as Dina, Sydney's best friend, whom she has a crush on
 Kathleen Rose Perkins as Maggie Novak, Sydney's widowed mother

Recurring

 Aidan Wojtak-Hissong as Liam Novak, Sydney's younger brother
 Richard Ellis as Brad Lewis, Dina's jock boyfriend whom Sydney dislikes
 David Theune as Mr. File, the high school science teacher
 Zachary S. Williams as Ricky Berry, confident, monied jock and Brad's best friend
 Jackson Frazer as Richard Rynard, a bully who torments Liam and whom Sydney confronts

Photographs of Alex Lawther and Jessica Barden are briefly used as an easter egg to their respectively portrayed characters James and Alyssa from The End of the F***ing World (2017–2019), the events of which are intended to be taking place simultaneously with those of I Am Not Okay with This.

Production

Development 
On December 12, 2018, it was announced that Netflix had given the production a series order for an eight-episode first season, of which only seven were produced. The series was created by Jonathan Entwistle and Christy Hall, who are credited as executive producers alongside Shawn Levy, Dan Levine, Dan Cohen, and Josh Barry. Entwistle also directed the series. The series was released on February 26, 2020. The series was renewed by Netflix for a second season. On August 21, 2020, Netflix canceled the series after one season, stating "COVID-related circumstances".

Casting 
Alongside the series announcement, it was announced that Sophia Lillis, Sofia Bryant, Wyatt Oleff, and Kathleen Rose Perkins would star in the series, with Aidan Wojtak-Hissong and Richard Ellis recurring in the series.

Filming 
Filming commenced in Pittsburgh in June 2019. The town of Brownsville, Pennsylvania served as a primary location, while Wilmerding's Westinghouse Arts Academy Charter School was used as the high school exterior.

Reception
On the review aggregator website Rotten Tomatoes, the series has an 87% approval rating with 67 reviews, with an average rating of 6.82/10. The website's critical consensus reads, "As awkward and charming as adolescence, but with twice the supernatural twists, I Am Not Okay With This first season at times veers into shallow territory, but Sophia Lillis' strong performance keeps it afloat." Review aggregator Metacritic gave the series a score of 68 out of 100 based on 16 critics, indicating "generally favorable reviews". The series was nominated for "Best Adaptation from Comic Book/Graphic Novel" at the 2020 Harvey Awards.

Episodes

References

External links
 
 

2020 American television series debuts
2020 American television series endings
2020s American black comedy television series
2020s American high school television series
2020s American science fiction television series
2020s American LGBT-related comedy television series
2020s American teen television series
English-language Netflix original programming
Television series about teenagers
Television shows about telekinesis
Television shows based on comics
Television shows filmed in Pennsylvania
Television shows filmed in Pittsburgh
Television shows set in Pennsylvania
Television productions cancelled due to the COVID-19 pandemic